Perry Hill may refer to

Perry Hill (baseball) (born 1952), American professional baseball coach
Perry Hill (Saint Joy, Virginia), an historic home near Saint Joy, Virginia, United States
Perry Vale, or Perry Hill, a neighbourhood, electoral ward and road in the London Borough of Lewisham, United Kingdom
Perry Hill Stadium, a former greyhound racing venue in Perry Vale, London, United Kingdom

See also
Perivale, an area in the London Borough of Ealing, United Kingdom.
Perry Hall (disambiguation)

Architectural disambiguation pages